Diosdado Mbele Mba Mangue (born 8 April 1997) is an Equatoguinean footballer who plays as a centre back for Futuro Kings FC and the Equatorial Guinea national team. He has been under the management of Dil sports Promotion since he was 13.

References

External links

1997 births
Living people
Sportspeople from Malabo
Equatoguinean footballers
Association football central defenders
Leones Vegetarianos FC players
AC Kajaani players
Equatorial Guinea international footballers
2015 Africa Cup of Nations players
Equatoguinean expatriate footballers
Equatoguinean expatriate sportspeople in Malta
Expatriate footballers in Malta
Equatoguinean expatriate sportspeople in Finland
Expatriate footballers in Finland